Dan "Big Dog" Ladouceur (born November 26, 1973 in Thunder Bay, Ontario) is a former lacrosse player. Ladouceur played ten seasons for the Toronto Rock in the National Lacrosse League, winning five championships, before retiring during the 2009 season.

Outside of lacrosse, Ladouceur is a constable with the Durham Regional Police Service.

On August 6, 2013, Ladouceur was announced as an assistant coach of the Toronto Rock, alongside Blaine Manning.

Statistics

NLL
Reference:

References

1973 births
Living people
Canadian lacrosse players
Canadian police officers
Lacrosse defenders
Lacrosse people from Ontario
People from the Regional Municipality of Durham
Sportspeople from Thunder Bay
Toronto Rock players
Toronto Rock coaches